Sogn og Fjordane Energi is a power company that operates in Sogn og Fjordane in Norway. It operates ten hydroelectric power stations and the power grid in the municipalities of Askvoll, Bremanger, Eid, Flora, Gloppen, Naustdal, Selje and Vågsøy. Annual average production is 1,263 GWh.

The company was created in 2003 and is owned by Sogn og Fjordane County Municipality (47.76%), Bergenshalvøens Kommunale Kraftselskap (38.51%) as well as the municipalities of Flora (4.71%), Gloppen (3.33%), Bremanger (2.51%), Askvoll (1.50%), Selje (1.45%), Eid (0.15%) and Naustdal (0.08%). It was created after a merger of SFE, Ytre Fjordane Kraftlag, Gloppen Elektrisistetsverk, Firdakraft and Eid Energi.

SFE has six wholly owned power stations, Skorge, Skogheim, Øksenelvane, Skogheim, Sagefossen, Åskåra as well as 35% of Leirdøla. It also operates three power stations owned by Gloppen municipality, Eidsfossen, Trysilfossen, Evebøfossen.

Electric power companies of Norway
Companies based in Sogn og Fjordane
Energy companies established in 2003